USS New York may refer to:

 , a gundalow built on Lake Champlain in 1776 that participated in the Battle of Valcour Island.
 , a 36-gun frigate commissioned in 1800 and burned by the British in 1814.
 , a 74-gun ship of the line laid down in 1820 which never left the stocks and was burned in 1861.
 A screw sloop named  Ontario laid down in 1863; renamed New York in 1869, and sold while still on the stocks, in 1888.
 ,  an armored cruiser commissioned in 1893, in action in the Spanish–American War, renamed to Saratoga in 1911, renamed Rochester in 1917, decommissioned in 1933, and scuttled in 1941.
 , a battleship laid down in 1911, commissioned in 1914, in action in both World Wars. Decommissioned in 1946 was used in both aerial and submerged atomic bomb tests that year. Surviving both, she was towed back to Pearl Harbor as a target ship and sunk following a massive assault by ships and planes in 1948.
 , a Los Angeles-class submarine launched in 1977 and retired in 1997.
 , an amphibious transport dock launched in 2007 and commissioned in November 2009.

See also
 

United States Navy ship names